General Sir William Gerald Hugh Beach,  (20 May 1923 – 4 September 2019) was a British Army officer who, in retirement, researched and advised on defence policy, arms control and disarmament, with an interest in promoting concerns about ethical issues of peace and war.

Early life
Beach was educated at Winchester College, Peterhouse, Cambridge (MA 1961) and the University of Edinburgh (MSc 1971).

Military career
Beach joined the Corps of Royal Engineers in August 1941. He saw active service in France and Belgium in 1944 and in Java in 1946. In Normandy he was ordered to clear a road of mines, but the first vehicle to use the road struck an undetected mine and was destroyed. He cleared the road again and rode on the next vehicle to use the road. In Belgium he was attached to the 11th Hussars. He was injured while reconnoitring a bridge, but insisted on filing a full report before being taken to hospital, enabling the British to capture the bridge.

During the 1960s Beach commanded an engineer regiment and an infantry brigade, both at Osnabrück in Germany. In 1964 he reorganised the volunteer reserves. He was director of army staff duties at the Ministry of Defence from 1971 to 1973, commandant of the Staff College, Camberley from 1974 to 1975, and Deputy Commander-in-Chief UK Land Forces from 1976 to 1977 before becoming Master-General of the Ordnance (Army Board member for Procurement) from 1977 to 1981.

Beach also served as Colonel of the Royal Pioneer Corps from 1976 to 1981.

Later life
Retiring from the army in 1981, Beach served as warden of St. George's House, Windsor Castle from 1981 to 1986, vice-Lord Lieutenant of Greater London from 1981 to 1987, Chief Royal Engineer from 1982 to 1987 and member of the Security Commission from 1982 to 1991. He chaired Ministry of Defence Study Groups on Censorship in War in 1983 and Education in the Army in 1984. He was director of the Council for Arms Control from 1986 to 1989. He was a member of the Board of Governors of Monkton Combe School from 1984 to 1993.  In the 1990s he was chairman of the governors of Gordon's and Bedales schools, and also chaired the boards of the Church Army and the Society for Promoting Christian Knowledge.

Beach was a member of the board or executive committee of: the Council for Christian Approaches to Defence, the Centre for Defence Studies (King's College London), the Verification Technology Information Centre (VERTIC), the International Security Information Service (ISIS), and of the British Pugwash Group. He lectured and contributed chapters to over two dozen books as well as publishing a number of monographs, articles and book reviews. In 1999 he co-authored, with Nadine Gurr, a book on British nuclear weapons policy and, in 2001, a briefing paper on cluster bombs,

In January 2009, The Times newspaper published a joint letter from Field Marshal Lord Bramall, General Lord Ramsbotham and General Beach arguing that the UK government should fund more realistic military needs rather than perpetuate its Trident programme, arguing that:

Beach died 4 September 2019 at age 96.

Personal life
Beach married Estelle Mary Henry, a doctor, in 1951. She died from an aortic embolism in 1989.

Honours
Beach held honorary Doctorate of Civil Laws from the University of Kent in Canterbury (1990). He was an honorary fellow of Peterhouse, Cambridge and of the Chartered Institute of Building Service Engineers, a Fellow of the Royal Society of Arts and a Companion of the Chartered Management Institute.

References

|-
 

|-
 

|-

1923 births
2019 deaths
Military personnel from London
Alumni of Peterhouse, Cambridge
Alumni of the University of Edinburgh
British Army generals
British Army personnel of World War II
Knights Grand Cross of the Order of the British Empire
Knights Commander of the Order of the Bath
People educated at Winchester College
Recipients of the Military Cross
Royal Engineers officers
Place of birth missing
Church Army people
Commandants of the Staff College, Camberley
Royal Pioneer Corps officers
Governors of Monkton Combe School
Deputy Lieutenants of Greater London